The Batchelder House is a historic home built in 1910 and located at 626 South Arroyo Boulevard in Pasadena, California. An important center of Pasadena cultural life in its day, the home was designed and built by Ernest A. Batchelder, a prominent leader of the Arts and Crafts Movement, and his wife, Alice Coleman, an accomplished musician. The house, a large bungalow, has a "woodsy" design with elements of a Swiss chalet style. Batchelder's first craft shop was located in the structure, where decorative tiles were made for Greene and Greene, the Heineman Brothers, and other noted local architects of the era. Coleman also used the house's backyard stage to host chamber music concerts.

The house was added to the National Register of Historic Places on December 14, 1978. It is part of the Lower Arroyo Seco Historic District.

Gallery

References

External links

 Pasadena Heritage Website

Houses in Pasadena, California
Arroyo Seco (Los Angeles County)
History of Pasadena, California
Houses completed in 1910
Houses on the National Register of Historic Places in California
Buildings and structures on the National Register of Historic Places in Pasadena, California
1910 establishments in California
American Craftsman architecture in California
Arts and Crafts architecture in California